Dorcadion janatai is a species of beetle in the family Cerambycidae. It was described by Kadlec in 2006.

References

janatai
Beetles described in 2006